Lost Planet Airmen is a 1951 black-and-white American science fiction film produced and distributed by Republic Pictures, which is actually the feature film condensation of their 1949 12-chapter serial, King of the Rocket Men.  Lost Planet Airmen was directed by Fred C. Brannon and written by Royal K. Cole and William Lively. The lead actors in Lost Planet Airmen were Tristram Coffin and Mae Clark.

Plot
Professor Millard (James Craven), a scientist who is a member of the group Science Associates, works in a secluded desert location in a cave laboratory on a secret research project. Reporter and photographer Glenda Thomas (Mae Clarke) is curious about that secret project. When she tours the Science Associates building, she meets Burt Winslow (House Peters, Jr.), the project's publicity director, and Jeff King (Tristram Coffin), a research project member.

The mysterious "Dr. Vulcan" is intent on stealing the various weapons being developed by the scientists of the Science Associates group. Vulcan hopes to make a fortune by selling these valuable devices to foreign powers. Dr. Vulcan's gang kills one of the scientists. To stop Vulcan and his operatives, Jeff dons a newly developed, atomic-powered rocket backpack, mounted on a leather jacket, which has a streamlined flying helmet attached that hides his identity. With the assistance of Dr. Millard, he continually foils the attacks by Vulcan's henchmen.

Vulcan plots to destroy New York City using a sonic ray device, which will cause massive earthquakes and flooding. Only "the rocket man" ultimately stands in his way and unmasks  Vulcan, exposing his real identity, while thwarting his diabolical plan of destruction.

Cast

 Tristram Coffin as Jeff King aka Rocket Man 
 Mae Clarke as Glenda Thomas
 Don Haggerty as Tony Dirken
 House Peters, Jr. as Burt Winslow
 James Craven as Dr. Millard
 I. Stanford Jolley as Professor Bryant
 Stanley Price as Gunther Von Strum
 Ted Adams as Martin Conway
 Marshall Bradford as Dr. Graffner
 Dale Van Sickel as Martin (archive footage)
 Tom Steele as Knox, a thug (archive footage)
 David Sharpe as Blears (archive footage)
 Eddie Parker as Rowan (archive footage)
 Michael Ferro as Turk (archive footage)
 Frank O'Connor as Warehouse Guard (archive footage)

Production
Lost Planet Airmen used scenes from King of the Rocket Men, which had been more cheaply made than previous Republic serials. Creating a compilation feature film allowed Republic to have another opportunity to exploit the serial for further profit; the studio's prospects of continuing multi-chapter serials in a waning market was not lost on management. Republic and Columbia Pictures were the last two film studios to offer serials in the mid-1950s. In 1956 Columbia offered only two 15-episode serials; that was the end the cycle.

This was one of 14 feature films Republic made from their serials. The title was changed to Lost Planet Airmen after using the working titles The Lost Planet and Lost Planetmen. The ending was changed for this feature version. Instead of New York City being reduced to rubble by a deluge, as in the serial, those events are dismissed as just the "dream of a mad man" and did not really happen. (A similar change was made in the feature version of Drums of Fu Manchu.)

Stunts
 David Sharpe as Jeff King/Tony Dirken/Prof Bryant (doubling Tristram Coffin in rocket suit, Don Haggerty & I. Stanford Jolley)
 Tom Steele as Jeff King/Burt Winslow (doubling Tristram Coffin and House Peters, Jr.)
 Dale Van Sickel as Jeff King/Tony Dirken (doubling Tristram Coffin in the helmet/rocket backpack and Don Haggerty)
 Carey Loftin as Burt Winslow (doubling House Peters Jr)
 Eddie Parker
 Bud Wolfe

Receptions
Jim Craddock, in VideoHound's Golden Movie Retriever 2001 included a slight mention of the "feature-length condensation of Republic's 12-part science fiction serial, King of the Rocket Man. He further noted (incorrectly) that, "Rocket man is pitted against the sinister Dr. Vulcan in this intergalactic (sic) battle of good and evil".

References

Notes

Citations

Bibliography

 Craddock, Jim, ed. VideoHound's Golden Movie Retriever 2001. Detroit: Gale/Cengage Learning, 2001. .
 Weiss, Ken and Ed Goodgold. To be Continued ...: A Complete Guide to Motion Picture Serials. New York: Bonanza Books, 1973. .

External links
 

1950s science fiction films
1951 films
American science fiction films
American black-and-white films
American aviation films
Republic Pictures films
1950s English-language films
Films directed by Fred C. Brannon
1950s American films